Enculturation is the process by which people learn the dynamics of their surrounding culture and acquire values and norms appropriate or necessary to that culture and its worldviews. As part of this process, the influences that limit, direct, or shape the individual (whether deliberately or not) include parents, other adults, and peers. If successful, enculturation results in competence in the language, values, and rituals of the culture. Growing up, everyone goes through their own version of enculturation. Enculturation helps form an individual into an acceptable citizen. Culture impacts everything that an individual does, regardless of whether they know about it. Enculturation is a deep-rooted process that binds together individuals. Indeed, even as a culture changes, center convictions, values, perspectives, and youngster raising practices are very similar. Enculturation paves way for tolerance which is highly needed for peaceful co-habitance  

The process of enculturation, most commonly discussed in the field of anthropology, is closely related to socialization, a concept central to the field of sociology. Both roughly describe the adaptation of an individual into social groups by absorbing the ideas, beliefs and practices surrounding them. In some disciplines, socialization refers to the deliberate shaping of the individual. In others, the word may cover both deliberate and informal enculturation.

The process of learning and absorbing culture need not be social, direct or conscious. Cultural transmission can occur in various forms, though the most common social methods include observing other individuals, being taught or being instructed. Less obvious mechanisms include learning one's culture from the media, the information environment and various social technologies, which can lead to cultural transmission and adaptation across societies. A good example of this is the diffusion of hip-hop culture into states and communities beyond its American origins.

Enculturation has often been studied in the context of non-immigrant African Americans.

Conrad Phillip Kottak (in Window on Humanity) writes:

Enculturation is sometimes referred to as acculturation in some of the literature. However, more recent literature has signalled a difference in meaning between the two. Whereas enculturation describes the process of learning one's own culture, acculturation denotes learning a different culture, for example, that of a host. The latter can be linked to ideas of a culture shock, which describes an emotionally-jarring disconnect between one's old and new culture cues.

Famously, the sociologist, Talcott Parsons, once described children as "barbarians" of a sort, since they are fundamentally uncultured.

How enculturation occurs 
When minorities come into the U.S., these people might associate with their racial legacy entirely down the road and subsequently take part in processing enculturation. Enculturation can happen in several ways. Direct education implies that your folks, instructors, or different individuals from your general public unequivocally show you certain convictions, esteems, or anticipated standards of conduct. For example, your folks could have shown you the societal norms of your way of life and reminded you not to guzzle your soup too boisterously or eat your food with your hands. Assuming you experienced childhood in a strict family and went to rigorous classes, you will have likely learned lessons on the convictions and customs specific to your religion. Lastly, at school, your teacher will have probably instructed you to  respect your flag and national anthem, concentrate on the historical backdrop of your country, and show the upsides of your way of life.

Participatory learning includes participating in exercises that impart specific qualities, convictions, and assumptions. For example, if your school organizes an outing to gather trash at a public park, this action assists with ingraining the upsides of regard for nature and ecological protection. Strict customs frequently stress participatory learning - for example, kids who take part in the singing of psalms during Christmas will assimilate the qualities and practices of the occasion.

Observational learning is when much knowledge is gained essentially by noticing and emulating others. As much as an individual related to a model accepts that emulating the model will prompt good results and feels that one is fit for mimicking the way of behaving, learning can happen with no unequivocal instruction. For example, a youngster who is sufficiently fortunate to be brought into the world by guardians in a caring relationship; will figure out how to be tender and mindful in their future connections.

See also
 Civil society
 Dual inheritance theory
 Education
 Educational anthropology
 Ethnocentrism
 Indoctrination
 Intercultural competence
 Mores
 Norm (philosophy)
 Norm (sociology)
 Peer pressure
 Transculturation

References

Further reading
School & Society: Learning Content through Culture. Henry T. Trueba (editor), Concha Delgado-Gaitan (editor). Praeger Publishers. New York. 1988. p. 167

External links
Enculturation and Acculturation
Community empowerment
Concepts of moral character, historical and contemporary (Stanford Encyclopedia of Philosophy)

Cultural concepts
Cultural studies
Interculturalism